Ayton Castle may refer to the following castles in the United Kingdom:
Ayton Castle, North Yorkshire, located near West Ayton, North Yorkshire, England
Ayton Castle, Scottish Borders, located to the east of Ayton in the Scottish Borders, Scotland